= Anglo-Italian Agreement of 1925 =

1925 agreement between the United Kingdom and Italy

The Anglo-Italian Agreement of 14–20 December 1925 was an Exchange of Notes between the governments of the United Kingdom and Italy regarding spheres of influence in Ethiopia. The notes implied that Italy was responsible for Ethiopia's external affairs and confirmed that Ethiopia lay within Italy's economic sphere of influence. On 9 June 1926 both powers presented these demands to the Ethiopian government, which rejected them, protesting to the League of Nations on 19 June. However, before the Members of the League could discuss the matter, the British and Italian governments announced that their notes had been misconstrued and backed off.
